The inferior suprarenal artery is a paired artery that supplies the adrenal gland. It usually originates at the trunk of the renal artery before its terminal division, but with many common variations. It supplies the adrenal gland parenchyma, the ureter, and the surrounding cellular tissue and muscles.

Structure 
The inferior suprarenal artery usually originates at the trunk of the renal artery. This is usually on its superior surface before its terminal division. It enters the parenchyma of the adrenal gland.

Variations 
Variations in the interior suprarenal artery are common. It usually originates from the renal artery before its final divisions, but may also originate as a final division or after the final divisions. More rarely, it may originate directly from the aorta. It may give off a small branch to the kidney.

There may be two or three inferior suprarenal arteries in some people. Its diameter changes significantly with age.

Function 
The inferior suprarenal artery supplies the adrenal gland (suprarenal gland). They also supply the ureter and some surrounding tissue and skeletal muscle.

Clinical significance 
The inferior suprarenal artery may be affected by an aneurysm. It may be assessed using Doppler ultrasound.

History 
The inferior suprarenal artery may also be known as the inferior adrenal artery.

See also 
Adrenal gland
Aorta
Superior suprarenal artery
Middle suprarenal arteries

References

External links 
  – "The suprarental glands. Blood supply to the suprarenal glands."
  – "Posterior Abdominal Wall: Blood Supply to the Suprarenal Glands"
 Photo of model at Waynesburg College circulation/leftinferiorsuprarenalartery

Arteries of the abdomen
Adrenal gland